Michael Keiner (born 8 February 1959 in Wetzlar, Germany) is a German poker player best known for winning a Seven-card stud WSOP bracelet in 2007.

Keiner, who used to be a plastic surgeon, started playing poker in 1993.
Starting 1995 he regularly played seven card. 1997 he became European Champion of Pot Limit Seven Card Stud.

His game of choice became Omaha Pot Limit cash games.

External links
 Official web site
 Hendon Mob tournament results

1959 births
German poker players
World Series of Poker bracelet winners
Living people
People from Wetzlar
Sportspeople from Giessen (region)